

Ecuador 
 Aníbal Chalá – Dijon – 2020–21
 Jackson Porozo – Troyes – 2022–

Egypt
 Hosny Abd Rabo – Strasbourg – 2005–06
 Mazhar Abdel Rahman – AS Monaco – 2002–03
 Anwar Gumei  – Sète – 1932–33, 1934–35
 Mido – Marseille – 2003–04
Mostafa Mohamed – Nantes – 2022–
Ahmed Abou Moslem – Strasbourg – 2005–06, 2007–08
 Ismail Rafaat – Sochaux, Sète – 1935–37

England
 Clive Allen – Bordeaux – 1988–89
 Joe Allen – RC Roubaix – 1936–38
 George Balmforth – Sète – 1932–33
 Folarin Balogun – Reims – 2022–
 Ross Barkley – Nice – 2022–
 William Frederick Barrett – Olympique Lillois – 1932–33
 David Bartlett – Excelsior Roubaix – 1932–34
 Fred Bartlett – Club Français – 1932–33
 Joey Barton – Marseille – 2012–13
 David Beckham – Paris Saint-Germain F.C. – 2012–13
 Bill Berry – Fives – 1934–37
 Joe Bryan – Nice – 2022–
 Alfred James Cable – CA Paris – 1932–33
 Alfred Leonard Caiels – Marseille – 1932–33
 Trevoh Chalobah – Lorient – 2020–21
 Joe Cole – Lille – 2011–12
 Laurie Cunningham – Marseille – 1984–85
 Cyril Dean – Rouen – 1938–39
 Karamoko Dembélé – Brest – 2022–
 Jantzen Derrick – Paris SG – 1971–72
 George Eastman – Fives – 1932–35
 R.E. Edwards  – Sète – 1932–33
 George Eardley Gibson  – Valenciennes, RC Roubaix – 1935–36, 1936–37
 Angel Gomes – Lille – 2021–
 Etienne Green – Saint-Étienne – 2020–22
 Alfred Gunn – Sète – 1947–49
 John Hall – Sochaux – 1933–34
 George Cecil Harkus – Fives – 1932–33
 Mark Hateley – AS Monaco – 1987–90
 Rhys Healey – Toulouse FC – 2022–
 Andrew Higgins – Olympique Lillois – 1935–36
 Joseph Hillier – Sochaux, Sète – 1932–33, 1933–36
 Stan Hillier – Cannes – 1932–34
 James Hindmarch – Cannes – 1996–98
 Glenn Hoddle – AS Monaco – 1987–90
 Joseph Hogan – RC Paris – 1932–33
 Sam Jennings – Marseille – 1932–33
 Frederick Kennedy – RC Paris – 1932–33, 1934–37
 Chris Kiwomya – Le Havre – 1996–97
 Levi Lumeka – Troyes – 2021–
 Bert Lutterloch – Olympique Lillois – 1932–34
 Arden Maddison – SC Nîmes – 1934–35
 Jack Major – CO Roubaix-Tourcoing – 1950–51
 Chris Makin – Marseille – 1996–97
 Cyril Martin – Marseille – 1947–48
 Stephy Mavididi – Dijon, Montpellier – 2019–
 George Messon – Sète – 1947–48
 Leslie Roy Miller – Sochaux – 1932–36
 Taylor Moore – Lens – 2014–15
 Harold Newell – Saint-Étienne – 1939
 James Peter O'Dowd – Valenciennes – 1935–36
 Sheyi Ojo – Reims – 2018–19
 Jonathan Panzo – Monaco, Dijon – 2019–21
 Arthur Parkes – Club Français – 1932–33
 Ernest Arthur Payne – Excelsior Roubaix – 1932–35
 Arthur Phoenix – RC Paris – 1932–33
 Arthur Plummer  – Valenciennes – 1935–36
 Walter Pollard – Sochaux – 1933–34
 Graham Rix – Caen, Le Havre – 1988–90, 1991–92
 John Roach – Sète – 1953–54
 Patrick Roberts – Troyes – 2021–22
 John Robertson – Sète – 1952–53
 Arthur Sales – Alès – 1932–33 and 1934–35
 George Scoones  – Rennes – 1933–35
 Gus Smith – Sochaux – 1932–33
 Djed Spence – Rennes – 2022–
 Simon Stainrod – Strasbourg – 1989
 Brian Stein – Caen – 1988–90
 Trevor Steven – Marseille – 1991–92
 J.A. Stewart  – Rennes – 1936-3
 George Tadman – Sète – 1946–47
 Geoffrey Taylor – Rennes – 1949–51
 Arthur Thurley – Red Star – 1934–35
 Jack Trees – Marseille – 1932–34
 Hugh Vallance  – Alès – 1932–33
 Chris Waddle – Marseille – 1989–92
 David Wall – Alès – 1934–35
 Harold Ward  – SC Nîmes – 1932–34
 William West – Alès – 1932–33
 John Westwood – Valenciennes – 1956–57
 Frank White – RC Paris – 1937–38
 Ray Wilkins – Paris SG – 1987–88
 Martin Woosnam – Club Français – 1932–33
 Billy Wright  – Rouen – 1938–39

References and notes

Books

Club pages
AJ Auxerre former players
AJ Auxerre former players
Girondins de Bordeaux former players
Girondins de Bordeaux former players
Les ex-Tangos (joueurs), Stade Lavallois former players
Olympique Lyonnais former players
Olympique de Marseille former players
FC Metz former players
AS Monaco FC former players
Ils ont porté les couleurs de la Paillade... Montpellier HSC Former players
AS Nancy former players
FC Nantes former players
OGC Nice former players
Paris SG former players
Red Star Former players
Red Star former players
Stade de Reims former players
Stade Rennais former players
CO Roubaix-Tourcoing former players
AS Saint-Étienne former players
Sporting Toulon Var former players

Others

stat2foot
footballenfrance
French Clubs' Players in European Cups 1955–1995, RSSSF
Finnish players abroad, RSSSF
Italian players abroad, RSSSF
Romanians who played in foreign championships
Swiss players in France, RSSSF
EURO 2008 CONNECTIONS: FRANCE, Stephen Byrne Bristol Rovers official site

References

Notes

France
 
Association football player non-biographical articles